Chaguaramas can refer to:

 Chaguaramas, Trinidad and Tobago
 Chaguaramas, Venezuela